Pogobie Tylne  is a village in the administrative district of Gmina Pisz, within Pisz County, Warmian-Masurian Voivodeship, in northern Poland.

It was called Hirschwalde from 1933–1945. (East Prussia).

References

Pogobie Tylne